Siriyakorn "Oom" Pukkavesa (born June 13, 1974 in Samut Prakan Province, Thailand) is a Thai actress, model, presenter, designer and magazine publisher. She is best known by her nickname, Oom (อุ้ม).

Life
Pukkavesa was born in 1974 in Samut Prakan Province. She is a graduate of Chulalongkorn University's Faculty of Communication Arts, majoring in Advertising.

Her break-out film role was as the lead actress in Monrak Transistor, a 2001 comedy-drama film by Pen-Ek Ratanaruang. She was named Best Actress at the Thailand National Film Association Awards for her role. Monrak Transistor was the first Thai film selected for the Directors' Fortnight at the Cannes Film Festival, where it screened in 2002.

She then co-starred in the 2003 psychological thriller, One Night Husband.

Other film roles include starring in The Adventures of Iron Pussy, co-directed by Apichatpong Weerasethakul, and in the Thai independent short film, Bicycles & Radios. She has also acted in numerous lakorns (Thai soap operas).

Since 2003, Siriyakorn has embarked on a career in business, producing her own lifestyle variety TV show 'Baanoom' (บ้านอุ้ม), creating her own line of kitchen utensils and publishing a self-titled lifestyle magazine and books, Oom.

She was married to Christopher Marquardt in 2011, and then moved to Portland, Oregon in 2012. She has 2 daughters, Metta and Annika. She is now an author at The Cloud online magazine.

Filmography

Thai drama

Awards
 1995 - 10th Golden Television Awards, Rom Chat
 1999 - 23rd Saraswati Awards, Best Upcoming Actress, Cloning
 2001 - Thailand National Film Association Awards, Best Actress, Monrak Transistor
 2002 - 26rd Saraswati Awards, Best Actress, Monrak Transistor

References

External links
Oom Lifestyle Book 

1974 births
Living people
Siriyakorn Pukkavesh
Siriyakorn Pukkavesh
Siriyakorn Pukkavesh
Siriyakorn Pukkavesh
Siriyakorn Pukkavesh